Broniszów may refer to the following places:
Broniszów, Lubusz Voivodeship (west Poland)
Broniszów, Subcarpathian Voivodeship (south-east Poland)
Broniszów, Świętokrzyskie Voivodeship (south-central Poland)